USS Beatty may refer to the following ships of the United States Navy:

Sources
 

United States Navy ship names